AS Eesti Küttejõud (also: AS Eesti Kütte-Jõud; commonly: Küttejõud; literally: Estonian Heating Power) was an oil shale company located in Küttejõu, Estonia. The Küttejõu township, now district of Kiviõli, is named after the company.

Eesti Küttejõud was established in 1922 by the Union of Estonian Industrialists. In 1925, the Tallinn pulp factory Põhja paberi- ja puupapivabrik acquired the company. At the same year, the Küttejõu open-pit mine was opened. Unlike other that time oil shale companies in Estonia, it did not have any shale oil extraction but only mining operations. It sold mined oil shale directly for heating fuel to the paper mill and power plants.

In 1939, the company produced 126,238 tonnes of oil shale.  After occupation of Estonia by the Soviet Union, the company was nationalized in 1940.

See also

 Eesti Kiviõli
 Eestimaa Õlikonsortsium
 Esimene Eesti Põlevkivitööstus
 New Consolidated Gold Fields
 Oil shale in Estonia

References

Bibliography 

 
 
 

Oil shale companies of Estonia
Ida-Viru County
Non-renewable resource companies established in 1922
Non-renewable resource companies disestablished in 1940
1922 establishments in Estonia
1940s disestablishments in Estonia
Defunct energy companies of Estonia
Defunct mining companies
Companies nationalised by the Soviet Union